The Minsheng–Xizhi or the Sky Blue line (Code: SB) of Taipei Metro is a planned line on the Taipei Metro. Its stations abbreviate as "SBXX," with XX being the station number (i.e. SB13).

Stations 

Note: all station names are only possible names.

Donghu branch line 
The planning of Donghu branch line is currently suspended and not included in the construction plan.

History 
December 2007: A corridor study was completed.
15 November 2013: The Department of Rapid Transit Systems will hold a public hearing regarding the line's planning.
21 October 2014: Early works commenced

References 

Taipei Metro